

This is a list of the National Register of Historic Places listings in Richmond County, Virginia.

This is intended to be a complete list of the properties and districts on the National Register of Historic Places in Richmond County, Virginia, United States.  The locations of National Register properties and districts for which the latitude and longitude coordinates are included below, may be seen in an online map.

There are 10 properties and districts listed on the National Register in the county, including 3 National Historic Landmarks.  Another property was once listed but has been removed.

Current listings

|}

Former listing

|}

See also

 List of National Historic Landmarks in Virginia
 National Register of Historic Places listings in Virginia

References

 
Richmond